Aldisa is a genus of sea slugs, dorid nudibranchs, marine gastropod molluscs in the family Cadlinidae.

Species
Species within the genus Aldisa include:
 Aldisa alabastrina (J. G. Cooper, 1863)
 Aldisa albatrossae Elwood, Valdés & Gosliner, 2000
 Aldisa albomarginata Millen in Millen & Gosliner, 1985
 Aldisa andersoni Gosliner & Behrens, 2004
 Aldisa banyulensis Pruvot-Fol, 1951
 Aldisa barlettai Ortea & Ballesteros, 1989
 Aldisa benguelae Gosliner in Millen & Gosliner, 1985
 Aldisa binotata Pruvot-Fol, 1953
 Aldisa cooperi Robilliard & Baba, 1972
 Aldisa erwinkoehleri Perrone, 2001
 Aldisa expleta Ortea, Perez, & Llera, 1981
  Aldisa pikokai Bertsch & Johnson, 1982
 Aldisa puntallanensis Moro & Ortea, 2011
 Aldisa sanguinea (J. G. Cooper, 1863) - Blood-spot doris
 Aldisa smaragdina Ortea, Pérez & Llera, 1982 
 Aldisa tara Millen in Millen & Gosliner, 1985
 Aldisa trimaculata Gosliner in Millen & Gosliner, 1985
 Aldisa williamsi Elwood, Valdes & Gosliner, 2000
 Aldisa zetlandica (Alder & Hancock, 1854)

Synonyms
 Aldisa berghi Vayssière, 1901: synonym of Doris ocelligera (Bergh, 1881)
 Aldisa nhatrangensis is a synonym of: Actinocyclus verrucosus

References